The Church of San Cipriano (Spanish: Iglesia Parroquial de San Cipriano) is a church located in Cobeña, Spain. It was declared Bien de Interés Cultural in 1996.

References 

Cipriano
Bien de Interés Cultural landmarks in the Community of Madrid